The Bachelorette Canada is a Canadian reality television dating game show based on the American series of the same name. The series is produced by Good Human Productions Inc. and airs on the women's specialty channel W Network.

Season 1 
The season premiered on September 13, 2016. This season features 28-year-old Jasmine Lorimer, a hairstylist and from Kenora, Ontario. Despite getting engaged during the finale, Wendt and Lorimer announced in April 2017, 11 months after their engagement (five months after it aired for viewers), that they had amicably parted ways.

Contestants
The contestants were announced on August 9, 2016.

Biographical information according to W Network's official series site, plus footnoted additions.

Future appearances

The Bachelor Winter Games 
Benoit Beauséjour-Savard and Kevin Wendt were chosen to compete at The Bachelor Winter Games as Team Canada. Benoit quit episode 2. Kevin W. and his partner, Ashley Iaconetti won and were in a relationship.

Bachelor in Paradise 
Benoit and Kevin W. both later returned to compete on the fifth season of Bachelor in Paradise. Benoit was eliminated week 3. Kevin W. split from Astrid Loch week 6, although they got back together after filming wrapped.

Bachelor in Paradise Canada 
Mike Ogilvie, Chris Kotelmach and David Pinard later competed in the inaugural season of Bachelor in Paradise Canada. Chris and David were eliminated week 2. Mike split from Stacy Johnson week 4. Kevin W. also returned as the bartender for the show.

Call-out order

 The contestant received a first impression rose
 The contestant received a rose during the date
 The contestant was eliminated
 The contestant won the competition

Episodes (dates)

Week 1
Original airdate: September 13, 2016

Week 2
Original airdate: September 20, 2016
Located in: Jamaica

One-on-one: Thomas. They take turns driving an ATV to a beach where they have dinner and Thomas talks about how he became a model. Thomas gets the rose.

Group Date: Chris, Benoit, Kevin P, Scott, Seth, Mike, Kyle and Drew. The men go to Tuff Gong studio where they divide into groups of two. Then they must write and perform their original songs to Jasmine. Group 1: Drew, Mike, Benoit, Scott. Group 2: Chris, Seth, Kevin P, Kyle. Group 2 wins and get more time with Jasmine while group 1 goes home.  Kevin P gets the rose.

Second Group Date: Andrew, Mikhel, J.P, Wale and Kevin W. The men battle in wrestling matches and J.P is crowned the winner. Afterwards, Jasmine and the men head to a blue hole. Kevin W receives the rose.

David is the only one this week to not get a date. At the cock tail party, Jasmine confronts Seth about their awkward kiss and they question their compatibility. He asks for a second chance.

Rose Ceremony: Wale and Seth are eliminated, with Seth telling Jasmine they had no chemistry upon exit.

References

2016 Canadian television series debuts
2016 Canadian television series endings
2010s Canadian reality television series
Canada Bachelorette
Canadian television series based on American television series
Canadian dating and relationship reality television series
Television shows filmed in British Columbia
Television shows filmed in Manitoba
Television shows filmed in Ontario
Television shows filmed in Morocco
W Network original programming